Stanislav Ptáčník (born 6 June 1956) is a Czech luger. He competed at the 1976 Winter Olympics and the 1984 Winter Olympics.

References

External links
 

1956 births
Living people
Czech male lugers
Olympic lugers of Czechoslovakia
Lugers at the 1976 Winter Olympics
Lugers at the 1984 Winter Olympics
People from Jablonec nad Nisou District
Sportspeople from the Liberec Region